Aerie (a variant of eyrie) is the bird nest of an eagle, falcon, hawk, or other bird of prey.

Aerie may also refer to:

Arts, entertainment, and media

Fictional entities
 Aerie (Baldur's Gate), a character in Baldur's Gate II
 Aerie Class, a class of Starfleet vessel in the Star Trek franchise
 Dragon Aerie, an area in Dark Souls II video game

Literature
 Aerie (magazine), a literary magazine
 Aerie, a novel in The Dragon Jousters series by Mercedes Lackey
 Aerie, a 2003 novel by Thomas E. Sniegoski in The Fallen series

Music
Aerie (album), a 1971 album by John Denver
 "Aerie (Gang of Eagles)", a song by Jefferson Airplane on the album Long John Silver

Other uses
 Aerie (American Eagle Outfitters), an intimate apparel brand of American Eagle Outfitters
 Aeries, the homes of the Fraternal Order of Eagles

See also
 Eagle's Nest (disambiguation)
 Eyrie (disambiguation)